Eric Victor Lambert (4 August 1920 – 1979) was an English professional footballer who played in the Football League for Hartlepools United as a full back.

Career statistics

References 

English Football League players
Clapton Orient F.C. wartime guest players
Association football fullbacks
1979 deaths
English footballers
1920 births
Footballers from Derby
Nottingham Forest F.C. players
Derby County F.C. players
Hartlepool United F.C. players